The Valletta Cup is a recurring Twenty20 International cricket tournament for associate members of the International Cricket Council in Europe. It is organised by the Malta Cricket Association, with the format being round-robin matches followed by a final; all matches are played at the Marsa Sports Club in Marsa, Malta. The first edition was held in 2019.

2019

The 2019 Valletta Cup was held between 17 and 20 October 2019. Four teams were involved: Malta, the Czech Republic, Iceland and a Hungary XI. Only matches played between Malta and the Czech Republic had official Twenty20 International (T20I) status. Czech Republic beat the Hungarian XI in the final.

2021

The 2021 tournament was held between 21 and 24 October 2021. The four teams were Malta, Bulgaria, Gibraltar and Switzerland. Malta defeated Switzerland in the final, while Bulgaria defeated Gibraltar in the third-place playoff.

2022

In 2022 the competition was expanded to six teams:Malta, Bulgaria, Czech Republic, Gibraltar, Hungary and Romania. It was held between 10 and 15 May 2022, and Romania defeated Malta in the final.

References

International cricket competitions in Malta
Marsa, Malta
Recurring sporting events established in 2019
Twenty20 International cricket competitions